

This list contains breeds and landraces of domestic geese as well as species with semi-domestic populations. Geese are bred mainly for their meat, which is particularly popular in Germanic languages countries around Christmas. Of lesser commercial importance is goose breeding for eggs, schmaltz, or for the fattened liver (foie gras). A few specialized breeds have been created for the main purpose of weed control (e.g. the Cotton Patch Goose), or as guard animals and (in former times) for goose fights (e.g., the Steinbach Fighting Goose and Tula Fighting Goose).

Goose breeds are usually grouped into three weight classes: Heavy, Medium and Light. Most domestic geese are descended from the greylag goose (Anser anser). The Chinese and African Geese are the domestic breeds of the swan goose (A. cygnoides); they can be recognized by their prominent bill knob.

Some breeds, like the Obroshin Goose and Steinbach Fighting Goose, originated in hybrids between these species (the hybrid males are usually fertile – see Haldane's Rule). In addition, two goose species are kept as domestic animals in some locations, but are not completely domesticated yet and no distinct breeds have been developed.

Breeds

 Adler goose (Адлерская) 
 African goose
 Alsatian goose (Oie d'Alsace)
 American buff goose
 Amorstream goose
 Anhui goose
 Aonghus goose
 Arzamas goose (Арзамасская)
 Austrian landrace (Österreichische landgans)
 Balien Eu goose
 Bavarian landrace (Bayerische Landgans)
 Benkov goose (Бяла Бенковска гъска)
 Bilgorey goose
 Bogdanovski goose (= Javakhetian goose)
 Bourbon goose (Oie du Bourbonnais, Blanche de Bourbonnais)
 Brecon buff goose
 Buff back goose
 Celle goose (Celler Gans)
 Changle goose
 Chinese goose
 Co goose
 Cotton Patch goose
 Curly breasted Sebastopol goose
 Czech goose (Česká husa)
 Czech crested goose (Česká chocholatá hus)
 Danish landrace goose (Danske gæs: grå, gråbroget)
 Daoxian goose
 Diepholz goose (Diepholzer Gans)
 Drava goose (Dravska guska)
 Emden goose (Emdener Gans)
 Emporda goose (Emporda-Gans)
 English saddleback goose (→Buff back goose)
 Euskal Antzara goose
 Faroese goose (Færøske gæs)
 Fighting goose (= Steinbacher Goose)
 Flemish goose (Oie flamande)
 Franconian goose (Fränkische Landgans)
 Garbonosa goose
 German laying goose (Deutsche Legegans)
 Gorki goose (Горьковская or Линдовская) 
 Gorkowska goose
 Greyback goose
 Han Tah Pra goose
 Hawaiian goose (Nene)
 Hungarian goose
 Huoyan goose
 Hwo goose
 Javakhetian goose
 Kaluga goose
 Kangan goose
 Kartuzy landrace (Kartuska)
 Kholmogory goose (Холмогорская)
 Kielce landrace (Kielecka)
 Koean goose
 Krasnozerskoye goose (Краснозёрская, Krasnozy, Skoye)
 Kuban goose (Кубанская)
 Landes goose (Oie des Landes)
 Large grey goose
 Leine goose (Leinegans)
 Lingzian goose
 Likewu goose
 Lionhead goose
 Lippe goose (Lippegans)
 Local geese of Karal and Massakory
 Local goose of Mandelia
 Lubelska goose
 Mongolian local geese
 Normandy goose (Oie normande; including Crested Normandy goose)
 Norwegian white goose (Norsk hvit gås)
 Nungan Mieu goose
 Obroshino goose (Оброшинська)
 Öland goose (Ölandsgås)
 Padans goose (Oca Padovana)
 Pereyaslav goose (Переяславская) 
 Philippine domestic goose
 Pilgrim goose
Pink-footed goose
 Podkarpacka goose
 Poitou goose (Oie du Poitou, Blanche de Poitou)
 Pomeranian goose (including Pomeranian Saddleback)
 Pskov bald goose (Псковская)
 Qingyang goose
 Rhenish goose
 Rhineland laying goose (Rheinische Legegans, extinct breed)
 Romanic goose (Romaanse gans)
 Roman goose (Oca Italiano)
 Romny goose
 Russian goose
 Rypinska goose
 Rung goose
 Scania goose (Skånegås)
 Sebastopol goose (Lockengans)
 Shadrinsk goose (→Ural Goose)
 Shetland goose
 Shitou goose
 Sichuan white goose
 Skanegas
 Slovak white goose (Slovenská hus)
 Smålen goose (Smålensgås)
 Solnechnogorsk goose
 Steinbacher goose (Steinbacher Kampfgans) 
 Subcarpathian goose (Podkarpacka)
 Suwalska goose (Suwałska)
 Suchovy goose (Suchovská hus)
 Synthetic Ukrainian goose
 Taihu goose
 Tame goose
 Toulouse goose (including Light Toulouse)
 Touraine goose (Oie de Touraine)
 Tufted Roman goose (→Roman goose)
 Tula goose (Tульская бойцовая) 
 Turkish goose
 Twente goose (Twentse landgans)
 Ural goose or Shadrin goose (Уральская or Шадринская)
 Venetian goose (Oca Pezzata Veneta)
 Vištinės goose (Vištinės žąsys) 
 Vladimir clay goose (Владимирская глинистая)
 Wanxi white goose
 West of England goose (including crested goose)
 Whet goose
 White Hungarian goose
 White Italian goose (→Roman goose)
 White Norman goose
 Wugang goose
 Wulong goose
 Wuzhong goose
 Xupu goose
 Yanguiang goose
 Yan goose
 Yili goose
 Yong Kang grey goose
 Zatory landrace (Zatorska)
 Zhedong goose
 Zhejiang white goose
 Zie goose

Auto-sexing goose

The plumage of male and female goose is usually the same. However, there are few auto-sexing goose, which are sexually dimorphic and the gender can be recognized on the first look by plumage. In general, ganders are white and females are either entirely gray, or pied gray and white.

 Cotton Patch Goose
 Normandy Goose
 Pilgrim Goose
 Shetland Goose
 West of England Goose

Semi-domesticated goose species
 Canada goose
 Egyptian goose

Footnotes

References

  (2001): The American Standard of Perfection. Mendon, Massachusetts.
 Food and Agriculture Organization of the United Nations (FAO): FAO ANIMAL PRODUCTION AND HEALTH PAPER - 154: Goose Production, Rome 2002, p. 140-145

External links
 Goose Breeds on poultrykeeper.com Photos of all standardized domestic geese in the UK.
 The British Waterfowl Association Goose Breed Information

 
Lists of breeds